Bellino Bellini (Venice, 1741- October 24, 1799) was an Italian painter, of the Rococo period.

Biography
He trained in Verona under Marco Marcuola. He mainly painted portraits. He traveled and worked extensively in Russia.

References

1741 births
1799 deaths
18th-century Italian painters
Italian male painters
Rococo painters
Painters from Venice
18th-century Italian male artists